Stork Bites Man is a 1947 American comedy film directed by Cy Endfield. it was the last of five short features from Comet Productions, a company owned by Mary Pickford, her husband Charles "Buddy" Rogers and former Columbia executive Ralph Cohn.

Premise
Ernie, an apartment manager gets fired and evicted when his boss, who hates kids, learns that Ernie's wife is pregnant. Taking advice from a mysterious, invisible stork, Ernie organizes an apartment workers' strike, which eventually forces his boss to soften up.

Cast
Jackie Cooper as Ernest (Ernie) C. Brown
Meg Randall as Peg Brown (as Gene Roberts)
Emory Parnell as Alan Kimberly
Gus Schilling as Hubert Butterfield
Sarah Selby as Mrs. Greene
Scott Elliott as Jerry
Marjorie Beckett as Mabel (as Marjory Beckett)
Ralph Peters as Morgan
Dave Willock as Lester
Stanley Prager as Voice of the Invisible Stork

Critical reception
TV Guide called the film an "innocuous comedy".
Allmovie called the film "only fitfully funny, 'Stork Bites Man' is brightened by the presence of veteran burlesque comedian Gus Schilling, making a meal of his role as a nursery-supply peddler."

References

External links
Stork Bites Man at IMDb

1947 films
1947 comedy films
American comedy films
American black-and-white films
Films scored by Raoul Kraushaar
1940s American films